A fang is a long, pointed tooth found in many animals, notably mammals, snakes, and spiders.

Fang(s) or The Fang may also refer to:

Geography
 Fang (town), in Thailand
 Fang County, in Shiyan, Hubei, China
 Fang, Iran, a village in Razavi Khorasan Province, Iran
 Fang District, a district of Chiang Mai province, Thailand
 Annapurna Fang, in Nepal, a peak in the Annapurna Massif
 Fang Ridge, on Ross Island, near Antarctica
 The Fang, the highest point of the ridge
 The Fang (frozen waterfall), Vail, Colorado, US

Languages
 Fang language, a Bantu language of the Central African Fang people
 Fang language (Cameroon), a Southern Bantoid language

People
 Fang people, in Central Africa
 Fang (surname), a Chinese surname and unisex given name
 Fang (alchemist) (fl. 1st century B.C.), Chinese woman alchemist

Given name
 Chen Fang (rower) (born 1993), Chinese rower
 Fang Liu (born 1962), Chinese attorney and first woman to be Secretary General of the International Civil Aviation Organization
 Fang Wong (born 1948), US Army officer
 Fang Wu (born 1990), Taiwanese singer-songwriter
 Fang-Yi Sheu (born 1971), Taiwanese-American dancer

Arts and entertainment

Books and comics
 Fang: A Maximum Ride Novel, a novel by James Patterson
 Fang (Harry Potter), Hagrid's pet dog in the Harry Potter series
 Fang (comics), a Marvel Comics character
 Fangs, a webcomic by Sarah Andersen

Fictional characters
 Fang, the main character in the upcoming indie video game Goodbye Volcano High
 F.A.N.G. (Street Fighter), in the video game series Street Fighter
 Fang (cat), the cat sidekick of Mona the Vampire
 Fang Brothers, two palace guards in the 16th-century Chinese novel Investiture of the Gods
 Fang the Sniper, a villain in the Sonic the Hedgehog series
 Fang, a mascot for the Arizona Rattlers
 Fang, a wolf zoanthrope in the video game and manga Bloody Roar
 Fang, a character in the Disney animated series Dave the Barbarian
 Fang, a secret agent dog on the television show Get Smart
 Fang, a main character in Maximum Ride
 Fang, Phyllis Diller's comedy routine husband
 Fang, a spider-headed villain in Teen Titans
 Fang, a shark character in the animated series Total Drama
 Cardinal Fang, a character in Monty Python's Spanish Inquisition sketch

Music
 Fang (band), a California punk band
 Fangs (album), by Falling Up, 2009

Other
 Fang (film), a 2018 American horror film
 F.A.N.G, a vehicle in the G.I. Joe: A Real American Hero 25th Anniversary toy series
 Fangs: The Saga of Wolf Blood, a 1991 Enix home computer game

Other uses
 Diamondback Energy (stock symbol FANG), an American energy exploration company
 FAANG or FANG, an acronym for the Big Tech companies Facebook, Amazon, (Apple), Netflix, and Alphabet/Google
 Fang, the primary component of the star Pi Scorpii

Unisex given names